Cubaemyiopsis is a genus of bristle flies in the family Tachinidae. There is at least one described species in Cubaemyiopsis, C. trinitatis.

References

Further reading

External links

 
 

Tachinidae